Marco Pecorari (born 21 September 1977) is an Italian footballer who played as a defender.

Career
Born in Palmanova, in Friuli region, Pecorari started his professional career at Fiorenzuola. He was signed by Empoli in the next season.

He was a player of Crotone until 2003, which he was signed by Triestina. In May 2005 Pecorari was signed by Lecce. In August 2006 he was loaned to Ascoli.

In January 2007 Pecorari was signed by Spezia in a definitive deal. On 31 January 2008 he was loaned to Ravenna.

In September 2008 Pecorari was signed by Avellino.

Arezzo
In 2009, he was signed by A.C. Arezzo. After the bankruptcy of the company and rebirth as Atletico Arezzo, Pecorari remained with the new company until 2014.

References

External links
 ascolicalcio.net  
 AIC profile (data by football.it) 
 FIGC 

Italian footballers
U.S. Fiorenzuola 1922 S.S. players
Empoli F.C. players
Genoa C.F.C. players
F.C. Crotone players
U.S. Triestina Calcio 1918 players
U.S. Lecce players
Ascoli Calcio 1898 F.C. players
Serie A players
Association football defenders
Spezia Calcio players
Ravenna F.C. players
U.S. Avellino 1912 players
Italy youth international footballers
People from Palmanova
1977 births
Living people
F.C. Vado players
Footballers from Friuli Venezia Giulia